Allegro may refer to:

Common meanings
 Allegro (music), a tempo marking indicate to play fast, quickly and bright
 Allegro (ballet), brisk and lively movement

Artistic works
 L'Allegro (1645), a poem by John Milton
 Allegro (Satie), an 1884 piano piece by Erik Satie
 "Allegro", any of several musical works in Nannerl Notenbuch by Wolfgang Amadeus Mozart
 "Allegro", a composition by Bear McCreary in Music of Battlestar Galactica
 Allegro (film), a 2005 Danish film by Christoffer Boe
 Allegro (musical), a 1947 musical by Rodgers and Hammerstein

Businesses and brands
 Allegro (website), a Polish e-commerce platform
 Allegro (restaurant), a luxury restaurant in Prague
 Allegro (train), a passenger train service between Helsinki and Saint Petersburg
 Allegro Coffee Co., a beverage company acquired by Whole Foods Market
 Allegro DVT, a French video codec company
 Austin Allegro, a car once manufactured by British Leyland
 Mazda Allegro, a car manufactured in South America as a version of Mazda Familia
 Líneas Aéreas Allegro, a Mexican airline

Science and technology 
 Allegro gravitational-wave detector
 ALLEGRO, European experimental gas-cooled fast reactor
 Allegro (software library), a multi-platform software library for video and audio application development
 Allegro 8 (software), risk management software by Allegro Development Corporation
 Allegro Common Lisp, a variant of the Common Lisp programming language
 Allegro Platform, an ECAD tool by Cadence Design Systems
 Allegro musical notation, a text-based score representation used by Audacity

Other uses
 Allegro (typeface), a typeface designed in 1936
 Allegro speech, a relatively fast manner of speaking
 John Marco Allegro, Dead Sea Scrolls scholar

See also
 Allegra (disambiguation)